is a one-shot comic created in 1986 by Takehiko Itō. It was published in C-Live magazine.

In 1987 original video animation was created based on the comic. It consists of one episode.

Original Video Animation

Production

Famous animator Kinji Yoshimoto worked on key animation for the project. Mechanical and ship animation direction was handled by Hiroshi Osaka. Setting design by Hajime Kamegaki, with character designs by Michitaka Kikuchi.

Voice cast

Minako Arakawa as Althea
Ryo Horikawa as Garorii
Nobuo Tobita as LM
Tesshô Genda as Nikolai
Daisuke Gouri as captain
Hiromi Yokota as Alice
Junko Ishida as Emily
Ken Yamaguchi as Brown
Shigeru Chiba as Jennings
Yukio Yamagata as Hacker

References

Mecha anime and manga